Love, Anarchy, and Emma Goldman: A Biography is a 1984 biography of Emma Goldman by Candace Falk. It is based on letters from Goldman's ten-year love affair with Ben Reitman.

Bibliography

External links 

 Full text at the Internet Archive

1984 non-fiction books
Biographies of Emma Goldman
English-language books
Holt, Rinehart and Winston books